

Top Division

Group A

Coach - Craig Hartsburg









Group B











See also
 2008 World Junior Ice Hockey Championships
 2008 World Junior Ice Hockey Championships - Division I
 2008 World Junior Ice Hockey Championships - Division II
 2008 World Junior Ice Hockey Championships - Division III

Rosters
World Junior Ice Hockey Championships rosters